The Venus House  is a historic house located in Opelousas, Louisiana in the United States. The house is named after its former owner and occupant, a free Creole woman of color, Marie Francois Venus. It is one of the oldest houses of its kind in the Lower Mississippi Valley. Today, the house serves as the center piece of the  Le Vieux Village.

The house was listed on the National Register of Historic Places on April 22, 1991.

History

The house, built c 1800, is the former home of Marie Francois Venus, a free Creole woman of color. The house was originally located in the small community of Grand Prairie. The house was constructed entirely of mortise and tenon construction. It features bousillage, a natural insulation that was once common in the walls of Cajun and Creole dwellings. It was usually made by mixing mud with spanish moss or animal hair and held into place by a series of wood bars (barreaux), set between the posts, which resulted into the walls.

References

See also
 National Register of Historic Places listings in St. Landry Parish, Louisiana

Houses on the National Register of Historic Places in Louisiana
Historic house museums in Louisiana
Houses in St. Landry Parish, Louisiana
18th century establishments in Louisiana
Creole architecture in Louisiana
Opelousas, Louisiana
National Register of Historic Places in St. Landry Parish, Louisiana